Renewable thermal energy is the technology of gathering thermal energy from a renewable energy source for immediate use or for storage in a thermal battery for later use. 

The most popular form of renewable thermal energy is the sun and the solar energy is harvested by solar collectors to heat water, buildings, pools and various processes. Another example of Renewable Thermal is a Geothermal or ground source Heat Pump (GHP) system, where thermal stored in the ground from the summer is extracted from the ground to heat a building in another season.  This example system is "renewable" because the source of excess heat energy is a reliably recurring process that occurs each summer season.

History of Renewable Thermal Systems 

Solar energy has been in use for centuries for heating dwellings and to produce hot water before low cost natural gas was discovered. It gained attention during and after the oil embargo of 1973 as engineers investigated ways to produce thermal energy from a renewable source instead of fossil fuels.  

The history of utilizing the ground as a heat source is more recent and has gained prominence in recent years especially in rural areas where natural gas heating may not be available. The outer crust of the Earth is a Thermal Battery that maintains a median temperature which is the same as the average air temperature at that location.  This "average ground temperature" is a combination in balance of solar gain from the sun, thermal gain from the core of the earth, and heat loss due to conduction, evaporation, and radiation.  The graphic at the right shows a map of the "average ground temperature" at locations within the United States.

Types

Solar-based Renewable Thermal

Ground-based Renewable Thermal

Season thermal energy storage

Policy by geography

New York State 
The state of New York took a big step in September 2015 when it created a new office titled Director of Renewable Thermal.  The NY Director of Renewable Thermal will oversee a team to help companies develop and implement renewable, low-carbon cooling and heating systems.  NY State considers this initiative a critical component of NYSERDA’s strategy to enable net-zero energy buildings, which produce the same amount of energy as they consume. It also will further advance New York’s progress toward creating self-sustaining energy markets for clean, renewable technologies.

Renewable Thermal has been a core resource in many states Renewable Portfolio Standards.  The report says: "State Renewable Portfolio Standard (RPS) programs have historically focused on electricity generation. However, some states have started incorporating renewable thermal power for heat generation into their RPS as a way to support the development and market growth of solar thermal, biomass thermal, geothermal, and other renewable thermal technologies."  The plan focuses on "Renewable thermal energy has many of the same benefits as other renewable technologies, including improved air quality, economic development and job creation, and the promotion of regional energy security." An industry public described on-site combustion as :responsible for 35 percent of fossil fuel greenhouse gas emissions in New York State. "

See also
 Thermal energy storage
 Seasonal thermal energy storage system
 Solar air heat
 Geothermal heat pump

References

Energy storage
Renewable energy